"Love Is All Around" is a song by The Troggs, later covered by Wet Wet Wet.

Love Is All Around may also refer to:

Music
 Love Is All Around (album), a 1976 album by Eric Burdon and War, or the title track
 "Love Is All Around" (Adriana Evans song)
 "Love Is All Around" (Agnes Carlsson song)
 "Love Is All Around" (DJ BoBo song)
 "Love Is All Around" (Sonny Curtis song), the theme song to The Mary Tyler Moore Show

Television
 Love Is All Around (TV series) (爱在你左右), a 2008 Malaysian Chinese drama series
 "Love Is All Around", the first episode of the TV series The Mary Tyler Moore Show
Love Is All Around, an episode of Hot in Cleveland
Love is All Around (2004 TV series) (사랑을 할꺼야), MBC weekend drama starring Jang Na-ra